Creating 602nd Anti-Aircraft Artillery Gun Battalion was an Anti-aircraft artillery battalion of the United States Army during World War II.

The unit began in 1942 as 1st Battalion of the 602d CA (AA) in Fort Bliss, briefly in New York City as Antiaircraft Artillery Command of the Eastern Defense Command and shipped over to Britain, then onto France and Germany (1944).

Notable members

 Sid Bernstein, music producer

References

Air defense artillery battalions of the United States Army
Battalions of the United States Army in World War II
Military units and formations established in 1942
Military units and formations disestablished in 1945